Denis Alekseyevich Tyurin (born 3 June 1980) is a Russian professional ice hockey winger who currently plays for HC Sibir Novosibirsk of the Kontinental Hockey League (KHL).

References

External links

1980 births
Living people
HC Sibir Novosibirsk players
Russian ice hockey left wingers
Sportspeople from Lipetsk